Archana Prajapati is an Indian actress and model. She has established a successful career in Bollywood and Bhojpuri cinema, but has also appeared in Hindi films. She was born and raised in Mumbai, Maharashtra, and debuted in Bhojpuri cinema in 2017 with the film Ziddi.

Early life and education
Archana Prajapati was born in Mumbai, Maharashtra, in financial humble family. She completed her education from Mumbai University and later pursued her acting career.

Career
Prajapati made her film debut in 2017 with the film Ziddi. Her next Hindi film was Nathuniya Pe Goli Mare 2, in which she played a reporter alongside Vikrant Singh Rajpoot and Antara Biswas.

Filmography
Films

Music Video

See also
 List of Bhojpuri cinema actresses

References

External links
 

Living people
Actresses from Uttar Pradesh
Indian television actresses
Actresses in Bhojpuri cinema
Indian film actresses
21st-century Indian actresses
Actresses in Hindi cinema
Year of birth missing (living people)